The 2014 Harrisburg Stampede season was the sixth season as a professional indoor football franchise and their first in the Professional Indoor Football League. One of 8 teams competing in the PIFL for the 2014 season.

The team played their home games under head coach Bernie Nowotarski at the Giant Center in Hershey, Pennsylvania. The Steelhawks earned a 4-8 record, placing 4th in the National Conference, failing to qualify for the playoffs

Schedule
Key:

Regular season
All start times are local to home team

Roster

Division Standings

References

External links
2014 Results

Harrisburg Stampede
Harrisburg Stampede
Harrisburg Stampede